JJ DOOM was an American alternative hip-hop duo composed of Jneiro Jarel and MF DOOM.

History
On 15 February 2012 the website Pitchfork ran an article stating that JJ DOOM's debut album would be called Key to the Kuffs and released via Lex Records. On 5 July 2012 Lex Records announced that the album was set for a worldwide release on 21 August 2012, and would feature appearances from Beth Gibbons, Khujo Goodie, Boston Fielder, and Damon Albarn.

As of August 29, 2012, Key to the Kuffs sold 3,300 copies after debuting at number 148 on the Billboard 200.

On August 19, 2013, an extended version, titled Key to the Kuffs (Butter Edition) was released, containing a bonus 9-track EP composed of new tracks and remixes.

After the death of MF Doom, a posthumous album is released, again in collaboration with Jneiro Jarel. The old Key to the Kuffs (Redux) is again available.

Discography

References

Alternative hip hop groups
American hip hop groups
Musical groups established in 2011
Musical groups disestablished in 2014
American musical duos
Hip hop duos
Lex Records artists
2011 establishments in the United States